La plaquita or la placa (English: little plate) is a bat-and-ball game played in the Dominican Republic with many similarities to cricket.

Several Dominican MLB baseball players have attested to playing it as children.

Rules 

Two teams of two players take turns fielding and batting. There are two wickets which are license plates (called placas in Spanish), with one fielder behind and one batter in front of each wicket. Batters run between the wickets to score runs, with one run scored for each swap of the batters, though they can be put out if a fielder runs them out by hitting a wicket with the ball while they are away from it. One of the fielding team's players throws the ball to the batter at the opposite wicket, who may then try to hit it. The fielding team's goal is to bowl the batter out by knocking over the wicket with the ball. Whichever team has more runs at the end of the game wins.

See also 
 Bete-ombro, a very similar Brazilian version of cricket
 Vitilla, another famous Dominican street bat-and-ball game

References 

Street cricket
Sport in the Dominican Republic